The 2017–18 Southeastern Conference men's basketball season began with practices in October 2017, followed by the start of the 2017–18 NCAA Division I men's basketball season in November. Conference play started in early January 2018 and ended in March, after which 14 member teams participated in the 2018 SEC tournament at Scottrade Center in St. Louis, Missouri. The tournament champion was guaranteed a selection to the 2018 NCAA tournament.

Preseason

Preseason All-American teams

Preseason polls

Media Day Selections

() first place votes

Preseason All-SEC teams

 Media select a five-member first team; coaches select an eight-member first team
 Players in bold are media choices for SEC Player of the Year; coaches do not select a preseason Player of the Year

Head coaches

Note: Stats shown are before the beginning of the season. Overall and SEC records are from time at current school.

Rankings

Regular season

SEC regular season
This table summarizes the head-to-head results between teams in conference play. Results updated through February 25, 2018.

Records against other conferences
2017-18 records against non-conference foes as of January 27, 2018:

Regular Season

Postseason

SEC Tournament

 March 7–11 at the Scottrade Center, St. Louis. Teams will be seeded by conference record, with ties broken by record between the tied teams followed by record against the regular-season champion, if necessary.

NCAA tournament

National Invitation Tournament

Honors and awards

Players of the Week
Throughout the conference regular season, the SEC offices named one or two players of the week and one or two freshmen of the week each Monday.

All-SEC Awards

Coaches

AP

NBA draft

Attendance
Note: teams that played more than 16 home games have a * by them

References

External links
SEC website